The 2012 La Flèche Wallonne was the 76th running of La Flèche Wallonne, a single-day cycling race.

The race was won by  rider Joaquim Rodríguez – a former two-time runner-up in the race – after making a late-race attack on the Mur de Huy.

Teams 
As La Flèche Wallonne was a UCI World Tour event, all 18 UCI ProTeams were invited automatically and obligated to send a squad. Seven other squads were given wildcard places into the race, and as such, formed the event's 25-team peloton.

The 25 teams that competed in the race were:

Results

References

External links

La Fleche Wallonne
La Fleche Wallonne
La Flèche Wallonne